Aeroponics is the process of growing plants in the air or mist environment without soil or an aggregate medium. The word "aeroponic" is derived from the Greek meanings of aer ("air") and ponos ("labour"). It is a subset of hydroponics, since water is used in aeroponics to transmit nutrients.

Methods
The basic principle of aeroponic growing is to grow plants suspended in a closed or semi-closed environment by spraying the plant's dangling roots and lower stem with an atomized or sprayed, nutrient-rich water solution.  The leaves and crown, often called the canopy, extend above.  The roots of the plant are separated by the plant support structure.  Often, closed-cell foam is compressed around the lower stem and inserted into an opening in the aeroponic chamber, which decreases labor and expense; for larger plants, trellising is used to suspend the weight of vegetation and fruit.

Ideally, the environment is kept free from pests and disease so that the plants may grow healthier and more quickly than plants grown in a medium.  However, since most aeroponic environments are not perfectly closed off to the outside, pests and disease may still cause a threat. Controlled environments advance plant development, health, growth, flowering and fruiting for any given plant species and cultivars.

Due to the sensitivity of root systems, aeroponics is often combined with conventional hydroponics, which is used as an emergency "crop saver" – backup nutrition and water supply – if the aeroponic apparatus fails.

High-pressure aeroponics is defined as delivering nutrients to the roots via 20–50 micrometre mist heads using a high-pressure diaphragm pump.

Benefits and drawbacks

Increased air exposure

Air cultures optimize access to air for successful plant growth. Materials and devices which hold and support the aeroponic grown plants must be devoid of disease or pathogens. A distinction of a true aeroponic culture and apparatus is that it provides plant support features that are minimal. Minimal contact between a plant and support structure allows for a maximal amount of air to reach the plant. Long-term aeroponic cultivation requires the root systems to be free of constraints surrounding the stem and root systems. Physical contact is minimized so that it does not hinder natural growth and root expansion or access to pure water, air exchange and disease-free conditions.

Benefits of oxygen in the root zone
Oxygen (O2) in the rhizosphere (root zone) is necessary for healthy plant growth. As aeroponics is conducted in air combined with micro-droplets of water, almost any plant can grow to maturity in air with a plentiful supply of oxygen, water and nutrients.

Some growers favor aeroponic systems over other methods of hydroponics because the increased aeration of nutrient solution delivers more oxygen to plant roots, stimulating growth and helping to prevent pathogen formation.

Clean air supplies oxygen which is an excellent purifier for plants and the aeroponic environment. For natural growth to occur, the plant must have unrestricted access to air. Plants must be allowed to grow in a natural manner for successful physiological development. If the natural growth of the plant is restricted by the support structure, the risk of damage to the plant and thereby disease increases .

Some researchers have used aeroponics to study the effects of root zone gas composition on plant performance. Soffer and Burger [Soffer et al., 1988] studied the effects of dissolved oxygen concentrations on the formation of adventitious roots in what they termed "aero-hydroponics." They utilized a 3-tier hydro and aero system, in which three separate zones were formed within the root area. The ends of the roots were submerged in the nutrient reservoir, while the middle of the root section received nutrient mist and the upper portion was above the mist. Their results showed that dissolved O2 is essential to root formation, but went on to show that for the three O2 concentrations tested, the number of roots and root length were always greater in the central misted section than either the submersed section or the un-misted section. Even at the lowest concentration, the misted section rooted successfully.

Other benefits of air (CO2)
Aeroponics may also involve managing  levels in the air within the system, which in turn affects the rate of photosynthesis within the plants.

Growing under artificial lights allows increased growth rates and reliability in comparison with solar lighting and can be used in combination with aeroponics.

Disease-free cultivation
Aeroponics can limit disease transmission since plant-to-plant contact is reduced and each spray pulse can be sterile. In the case of soil, aggregate, or other media, disease can spread throughout the growth media, infecting many plants. In most greenhouses, these solid media require sterilization after each crop and, in many cases, are simply discarded and replaced with fresh, sterile media.

A distinct advantage of aeroponic technology is that if a particular plant does become diseased, it can be quickly removed from the plant support structure without disrupting or infecting the other plants.

Due to the disease-free environment that is unique to aeroponics, many plants can grow at higher density (plants per square meter) when compared to more traditional forms of cultivation (hydroponics, soil and Nutrient Film Technique [NFT]). Commercial aeroponic systems incorporate hardware features that accommodate the crop's expanding root systems.

Researchers have described aeroponics as a "valuable, simple, and rapid method for preliminary screening of genotypes for resistance to specific seedling blight or root rot".

The isolating nature of the aeroponic system allowed them to avoid the complications encountered when studying these infections in soil culture.

Water and nutrient hydro-atomization
Aeroponic equipment involves the use of sprayers, misters, foggers, or other devices to create a fine mist of solution to deliver nutrients to plant roots. Aeroponic systems are normally closed-looped systems providing macro and micro-environments suitable to sustain a reliable, constant air culture. Numerous inventions have been developed to facilitate aeroponic spraying and misting. The key to root development in an aeroponic environment is the size of the water droplet. In commercial applications, a hydro-atomizing spray at 360° is employed to cover large areas of roots utilizing air pressure misting.

A variation of the mist technique, known as fogponics, employs the use of ultrasonic foggers to mist nutrient solutions in low-pressure aeroponic devices.

Water droplet size is crucial for sustaining aeroponic growth. Too large a water droplet means less oxygen is available to the root system. Too fine a water droplet, such as those generated by the ultrasonic mister, produce excessive root hair without developing a lateral root system for sustained growth in an aeroponic system.

Mineralization of the ultrasonic transducers requires maintenance and potential for component failure. This is also a shortcoming of metal spray jets and misters. Restricted access to the water causes the plant to lose turgidity and wilt.

Advanced materials
NASA has funded research and development of new advanced materials to improve aeroponic reliability and maintenance reduction. It also has been determined that high pressure hydro-atomized mist of 5–50 micrometres micro-droplets is necessary for long-term aeroponic growth.

For long-term growth, the mist system must have significant pressure to force the mist into the dense root system(s). Repeatability is the key to aeroponics and includes the hydro-atomized droplet size. Degradation of the spray due to mineralization of mist heads inhibits the delivery of the water nutrient solution, leading to an environmental imbalance in the air culture environment.

Special low-mass polymer materials were developed and are used to eliminate mineralization in next generation hydro-atomizing misting and spray jets.

Nutrient uptake

The discrete nature of interval and duration aeroponics allows the measurement of nutrient uptake over time under varying conditions.  Barak et al. used an aeroponic system for non-destructive measurement of water and ion uptake rates for cranberries (Barak, Smith et al. 1996).

In their study, these researchers found that by measuring the concentrations and volumes of input and efflux solutions, they could accurately calculate the nutrient uptake rate (which was verified by comparing the results with N-isotope measurements).  After verification of their analytical method, Barak et al. went on to generate additional data specific to the cranberry, such as diurnal variation in nutrient uptake, correlation between ammonium uptake and proton efflux, and the relationship between ion concentration and uptake.  Work such as this not only shows the promise of aeroponics as a research tool for nutrient uptake, but also opens up possibilities for the monitoring of plant health and optimization of crops grown in closed environments.

Atomization (>), increases bioavailability of nutrients, consequently, nutrient strength must be significantly reduced or leaf and root burn will develop. Note the large water droplets in the photo to the right. This is caused by the feed cycle being too long or the pause cycle too short; either discourages both lateral root growth and root hair development. Plant growth and fruiting times are significantly shortened when feed cycles are as short as possible.  Ideally, roots should never be more than slightly damp or overly dry. A typical feed/pause cycle is < 2 seconds on, followed by ~1.5–2 minute pause- 24/7, however, when an accumulator system is incorporated, cycle times can be further reduced to < ~1 second on, ~1 minute pause.

As a research tool
Soon after its development, aeroponics took hold as a valuable research tool. Aeroponics offered researchers a noninvasive way to examine roots under development. This new technology also allowed researchers a larger number and a wider range of experimental parameters to use in their work.

The ability to precisely control the root zone moisture levels and the amount of water delivered makes aeroponics ideally suited for the study of water stress.  K. Hubick evaluated aeroponics as a means to produce consistent, minimally water-stressed plants for use in drought or flood physiology experiments.

Aeroponics is the ideal tool for the study of root morphology. The absence of aggregates offers researchers easy access to the entire, intact root structure without the damage that can be caused by removal of roots from soils or aggregates. It's been noted that aeroponics produces more normal root systems than hydroponics.

Terminology
Aeroponic growing refers to plants grown in an air culture that can develop and grow in a normal and natural manner.

Aeroponic growth refers to growth achieved in an air culture.

Aeroponic system refers to hardware and system components assembled to sustain plants in an air culture.

Aeroponic greenhouse refers to a climate controlled glass or plastic structure with equipment to grow plants in air/mist environment.

Aeroponic conditions refers to air culture environmental parameters for sustaining plant growth for a plant species.

Aeroponic roots refers to a root system grown in an air culture.

Types of aeroponics

Low-pressure units
In most low-pressure aeroponic gardens, the plant roots are suspended above a reservoir of nutrient solution or inside a channel connected to a reservoir.  A low-pressure pump delivers nutrient solution via jets or by ultrasonic transducers, which then drips or drains back into the reservoir.  As plants grow to maturity in these units they tend to have dry sections of the root systems, which prevent adequate nutrient uptake.  These units, because of cost, lack features to purify the nutrient solution, and adequately remove incontinuities, debris, and unwanted pathogens. Such units are usually suitable for bench top growing and demonstrating the principles of aeroponics.

High-pressure devices

High-pressure aeroponic techniques, where the mist is generated by high-pressure pump(s), are typically used in the cultivation of high value crops and plant specimens that can offset the high setup costs associated with this method of horticulture.

High-pressure aeroponics systems include technologies for air and water purification, nutrient sterilization, low-mass polymers and pressurized nutrient delivery systems.

Commercial systems
Commercial aeroponic systems consist of high-pressure device hardware and biological systems. The biological systems matrix includes enhancements for extended plant life and crop maturation.

Biological subsystems and hardware components include effluent controls systems, disease prevention, pathogen resistance features, precision timing and nutrient solution pressurization, heating and cooling sensors, thermal control of solutions, efficient photon-flux light arrays, spectrum filtration spanning, fail-safe sensors and protection, reduced maintenance & labor saving features, and ergonomics and long-term reliability features.

Commercial aeroponic systems, like the high-pressure devices, are used for the cultivation of high value crops where multiple crop rotations are achieved on an ongoing commercial basis.

Advanced commercial systems include data gathering, monitoring, analytical feedback and internet connections to various subsystems.

History

In 1911, V.M.Artsikhovski published in the journal "Experienced Agronomy" an article "On Air Plant Cultures", which talks about his method of physiological studies of root systems by spraying various substances in the surrounding air - the aeroponics method. He designed the first aeroponics and in practice showed their suitability for plant cultivation.

It was W. Carter in 1942 who first researched air culture growing and described a method of growing plants in water vapor to facilitate examination of roots.
As of 2006, aeroponics is used in agriculture around the globe.

In 1944, L.J. Klotz was the first to discover vapor misted citrus plants in a facilitated research of his studies of diseases of citrus and avocado roots.  In 1952, G.F. Trowel grew apple trees in a spray culture.

It was F. W. Went in 1957 who first coined the air-growing process as "aeroponics", growing coffee plants and tomatoes with air-suspended roots and applying a nutrient mist to the root section.

Genesis Machine, 1983

The first commercially available aeroponic apparatus was manufactured and marketed by GTi in 1983.  It was known then as the Genesis Machine - taken from the movie Star Trek II: The Wrath of Khan.  The Genesis Machine was marketed as the "Genesis Rooting System".

GTi's device incorporated an open-loop water driven apparatus, controlled by a microchip, and delivered a high pressure, hydro-atomized nutrient spray inside an aeroponic chamber.  The Genesis Machine connected to a water faucet and an electrical outlet.

Aeroponic propagation (cloning)

Aeroponic culturing revolutionized cloning (vegetative propagation) from cuttings of plants. Numerous plants which were previously considered difficult, or impossible, became easier to propagate via stem cuttings in aeroponics, such as delicate hardwoods or cacti which were sensitive to bacterial infection in cuttings. The overall success of propagation with the use of aeroponics is that the system creates a highly aerated environment around the root, which causes good root hair development (Soffer and Burger, 1988). There is also more root and growth development due to the nutrients supplied to the plants through the aeroponics system (Santos and Fisher 2009). Since the roots are not grown in any rooting media, it minimizes the risk of the plants getting infected by root disease (Mehandru et al. 2014).

The use of aeroponic is important for helping to propagate plants with low rate of success in vegetative propagation, plants that have important medicinal uses, plants that are in high demand, and to create new cultivars of certain plant species. Leptadenia reticulata is an important plant used in medicines that also has a low reproduction rate through both seed and cuttings (Mehandru et al. 2014). Aeroponics has made it easier to propagate some these important medicinal plants (Mehandru et al. 2014). Ulmus Americana, which was almost completely wiped out by Dutch elm disease, along with other cultivars of the species have also shown some success through propagation with aeroponics allowing for elm trees to be more available on the market (Oakes et al. 2012).

Aeroponics is a more viable alternative to the traditionally used process of overhead misters (Peterson et al. 2018). There is a higher success rate with the use of aeroponics compared to overhead misters, and with the overhead misters there are drawbacks such as needing to apply large volumes of water, having potentially unsanitary conditions, having irregular misting coverage, and potential leaching of foliar nutrients (Peterson et al. 2018). In short, cloning became easier because the aeroponic apparatus initiated faster and cleaner root development through a sterile, nutrient rich, highly oxygenated, and moist environment (Hughes, 1983).

Air-rooted transplants

Aeroponics significantly advanced tissue culture technology.  It cloned plants in less time and reduced numerous labor steps associated with tissue culture techniques.  Aeroponics could eliminate stage I and stage II plantings into soil (the bane of all tissue culture growers). Tissue culture plants must be planted in a sterile media (stage-I) and expanded out for eventual transfer into sterile soil (stage-II). After they are strong enough they are transplanted directly to field soil. Besides being labor-intensive, the entire process of tissue culture is prone to disease, infection, and failure.

With the use of aeroponics, growers cloned and transplanted air-rooted plants directly into field soil. Aeroponic roots were not susceptible to wilting and leaf loss, or loss due to transplant shock (something hydroponics can never overcome).  Because of their healthiness, air-rooted plants were less likely to be infected with pathogens. (If the RH of the root chamber gets above 70 degrees F, fungus gnats, algae, anaerobic bacteria are likely to develop.)

The efforts by GTi ushered in a new era of artificial life support for plants capable of growing naturally without the use of soil or hydroponics.  GTi received a patent for an all-plastic aeroponic method and apparatus, controlled by a microprocessor in 1985.

Aeroponics became known as a time and cost saver.  The economic factors of aeroponic's contributions to agriculture were taking shape.

Genesis Growing System, 1985

By 1985, GTi introduced second generation aeroponics hardware, known as the "Genesis Growing System". This second generation aeroponic apparatus was a closed-loop system. It utilized recycled effluent precisely controlled by a microprocessor. Aeroponics graduated to the capability of supporting seed germination, thus making GTi's the world's first plant and harvest aeroponic system.

Many of these open-loop unit and closed-loop aeroponic systems are still in operation today.

Commercialization
Aeroponics eventually left the laboratories and entered into the commercial cultivation arena. In 1966, commercial aeroponic pioneer B. Briggs succeeded in inducing roots on hardwood cuttings by air-rooting. Briggs discovered that air-rooted cuttings were tougher and more hardened than those formed in soil and concluded that the basic principle of air-rooting is sound. He discovered air-rooted trees could be transplanted to soil without having transplant shock or setback to normal growth. Transplant shock is normally observed in hydroponic transplants.

In Israel in 1982, L. Nir developed a patent for an aeroponic apparatus using compressed low-pressure air to deliver a nutrient solution to suspended plants, held by styrofoam, inside large metal containers.

In summer 1976, British researcher John Prewer carried out a series of aeroponic experiments near Newport, Isle of Wight, U.K., in which lettuces (variety Tom Thumb) were grown from seed to maturity in 22 days in polyethylene film tubes made rigid by pressurized air supplied by ventilating fans. The equipment used to convert the water-nutrient into fog droplets was supplied by Mee Industries of California. "In 1984 in association with John Prewer, a commercial grower on the Isle of Wight - Kings Nurseries - used a different design of aeroponics system to grow strawberry plants. The plants flourished and produced a heavy crop of strawberries which were picked by the nursery's customers. The system proved particularly popular with elderly customers who appreciated the cleanliness, quality and flavor of the strawberries, and the fact they did not have to stoop when picking the fruit."

In 1983, R. Stoner filed a patent for the first microprocessor interface to deliver tap water and nutrients into an enclosed aeroponic chamber made of plastic. Stoner has gone on to develop numerous companies researching and advancing aeroponic hardware, interfaces, biocontrols and components for commercial aeroponic crop production.

In 1985, Stoner's company, GTi, was the first company to manufacture, market and apply large-scale closed-loop aeroponic systems into greenhouses for commercial crop production.

In the 1990s, GHE or General Hydroponics [Europe] thought to try to introduce aeroponics to the hobby hydroponics market and finally produced the Aerogarden system.  However, this could not be classed as 'true' aeroponics because the Aerogarden produced tiny droplets of solution rather than a fine mist of solution; the fine mist was meant to reproduce true Amazon rain.  In any case, a product was introduced to the market and the grower could broadly claim to be growing their hydroponic produce aeroponically. A demand for aeroponic growing in the hobby market had been established and moreover it was thought of as the ultimate hydroponic growing technique. The difference between true aeroponic mist growing and aeroponic droplet growing had become very blurred in the eyes of many people. At the end of the nineties, a UK firm, Nutriculture, was encouraged enough by industry talk to trial true aeroponic growing; although these trials showed positive results compared with more traditional growing techniques such as Nutrient Film Technique (NFT) and Ebb & Flood there were drawbacks, namely cost and maintenance. To accomplish true mist aeroponics a special pump had to be used which also presented scalability problems. Droplet-aeroponics was easier to manufacture, and as it produced comparable results to mist-aeroponics, Nutriculture began development of a scalable, easy to use droplet-aeroponic system.  Through trials they found that aeroponics was ideal for plant propagation; plants could be propagated without medium and could even be grown-on. In the end, Nutriculture acknowledged that better results could be achieved if the plant was propagated in their branded X-stream aeroponic propagator and moved on to a specially designed droplet-aeroponic growing system - the Amazon.

Aeroponically grown food
In 1986, Stoner became the first person to market fresh aeroponically grown food to a national grocery chain. He was interviewed on NPR and discussed the importance of the water conservation features of aeroponics for both modern agriculture and space.

Aeroponics in space

Space plants

Plants were first taken into Earth's orbit in 1960 on two separate missions, Sputnik 4 and Discoverer 17 (for a review of the first 30 years of plant growth in space, see Halstead and Scott 1990).  On the former mission, wheat, pea, maize, spring onion, and Nigella damascena seeds were carried into space, and on the latter mission Chlorella pyrenoidosa cells were brought into orbit.

Plant experiments were later performed on a variety of Bangladesh, China, and joint Soviet-American missions, including Biosatellite II (Biosatellite program), Skylab 3 and 4, Apollo–Soyuz, Sputnik, Vostok, and Zond.  Some of the earliest research results showed the effect of low gravity on the orientation of roots and shoots (Halstead and Scott 1990).

Subsequent research went on to investigate the effect of low gravity on plants at the organismic, cellular, and subcellular levels. At the organismic level, a variety of species, including pine, oat, mung bean, lettuce, cress, and Arabidopsis thaliana, showed decreased seedling, root, and shoot growth in low gravity, whereas lettuce grown on Cosmos showed the opposite effect of growth in space (Halstead and Scott 1990). Mineral uptake seems also to be affected in plants grown in space.  Additionally, peas grown in space exhibited increased levels of phosphorus and potassium and decreased levels of the divalent cations calcium, magnesium, manganese, zinc, and iron (Halstead and Scott 1990).

Biocontrols in space
In 1996, NASA funded Richard Stoner's research to develop a natural liquid biocontrol, known then as organic disease control (ODC), to prevent plant diseases and increase yields without the  use of pesticides for closed-loop hydroponic systems. By 1997, Stoner's biocontrol experiments were conducted by NASA. BioServe Space Technologies's GAP technology (miniature growth chambers) delivered the ODC solution unto bean seeds. Triplicate ODC experiments were conducted in GAP's flown to the MIR by the space shuttle; at the Kennedy Space Center; and at Colorado State University (J. Linden). All GAPS were housed in total darkness to eliminate light as an experiment variable. The NASA experiment was to study only the benefits of the biocontrol.

NASA's enclosed environment bean experiments aboard the MIR space station and shuttle confirmed that ODC elicited increased germination rate, better sprouting, increased growth and natural plant disease mechanisms. Though originally developed with NASA, ODC is not just for space. Soil and hydroponics growers can benefit by incorporating ODC into their planting techniques, as ODC meets USDA NOP standards for organic farms.

One example of ODC's expansion in agriculture is the ODC product line, which caters to emerging agricultural crops, such as cannabis. The active ingredients in the ODC cannabis line contain the original active ingredient chitosan at 0.25%, as well as 0.28% colloidal nitrogen, and 0.05% calcium.

In order to make hydroponic and aeroponic systems inherently more resilient to plant disease and less reliant upon chemical supplementation, NASA investigates environmental biocontrols integrated into the system's design. For example, NASA's Advanced Plant Habitat (APA) has been in operation on the ISS since 2018. The APA is equipped with more than 180 sensors which allows for the optimization of plant growth, health, and monitoring in space, while decreasing reliance upon chemical additive biocontrols. These environmental controls and sensors include lighting (intensity, spectrum, and photoperiod), temperature, CO2, relative humidity, irrigation, as well as plant-derived ethylene and volatile organic compound (VOC) scrubbing. Additionally, APA is equipped with leaf temperature sensors, root zone temperature, root zone moisture sensors, as well as oxygen concentration meters.

These environmental controls typically inhibit plant diseases through two methods. The first method is to maintain environmental conditions that directly impact and inhibit diseases, fungus, and pests. For example, by monitoring and controlling environmental conditions such as temperature and humidity, the risk of botrytis infection in leaves are reduced as the environment is not conducive for disease proliferation. The second method is to provide environmental conditions that promote the plant's natural disease prevention mechanisms, whereby indirectly inhibiting the effects of plant diseases. This method has been explored through light experiments with peppers. For example, peppers grown under blue light conditions showed more resilience to powdery mildew.

Aeroponics for Earth and space

In 1998, Stoner received NASA funding to develop a high performance aeroponic system for use on earth and in space. Stoner demonstrated significantly increased growth rates of dry biomass in lettuce plants grown in aeroponic systems compared to other cultivation techniques. NASA subsequently utilized numerous aeroponic advancements developed by Stoner.

Research was conducted to identify and develop technologies for rapid plant growth in a variety of gravitational environments.  Low-gravity environments pose problems like effectively delivering water and nutrients to plants and recovering the effluents.  Food production in space faces other challenges including water handling, minimization of water use, and minimization of the systems weight.  Food production on planetary bodies like the Moon and Mars will also require dealing with reduced gravity environments.  Because of the different fluid dynamics present at differing levels of gravity a major focus in developing plant growth systems has been optimizing nutrient delivery systems.

There are a number of nutrient delivery methods currently utilized (both on Earth and in low gravity).  Substrate dependent methods include traditional soil cultivation, zeoponics, agar, and nutrient-loaded ion exchange resins.  In addition to substrate dependent cultivation, many methods that don't use soil have been developed including the nutrient film technique, ebb and flow, aeroponics, and many others.  Because of their high nutrient solution throughput hydroponic systems can produce rapid plant growth. This necessitates large water volumes and substantial recycling of the solution which makes controlling solutions more difficult in microgravity conditions.

To deliver nutrients aeroponic systems use hydro-atomized sprays that minimize water use, increase root oxygenation, and produce excellent plant growth. The nutrient solution throughput of aeroponic systems is higher than in other systems developed to operate in low gravity. Aeroponics' elimination of substrates and the need for large nutrient stockpiles reduce the amount of waste material that needs to be processed by other life support systems.  The removal of the need for a substrate also simplifies planting and harvesting (making automation easier), decreases the weight and volume of expendable materials, and eliminates a potential pathogen transmission pathway.  These advantages demonstrate the potential of aeroponic production in microgravity and the efficient production of food in outer space.

NASA inflatable aeroponics

In 1999, NASA funded development of an inflatable low-mass aeroponic system (AIS) for space and Earth high performance food production. AIS is a self-contained, self-supporting, inflatable aeroponic crop production system capable of controlling nutrient/mist delivery to the plant roots. Being an inflatable structure, AIS is lightweight, and can be deflated to take up less volume during transportation and storage. The current iteration of AIS improved upon the previous design that used rigid structures, which are more expensive to manufacture and transport.

On Earth, expensive materials and transportation may hinder the economic feasibility of aeroponic systems for commercial growers. However, such obstacles become magnified when considering payload mass for space transportation.

Due to the mass and volume restraints, NASA developed specialized materials for inflatable habitats and structures to withstand the space environment. These aramid-like materials are currently being used to develop Bigelow Aerospace's expandible habitats. One of Bigelow's Expandable Activity Modules has been successfully tested in space.

Benefits of aeroponics for earth and space

Aeroponics possesses many characteristics that make it an effective and efficient means of growing plants.

Less nutrient solution throughout

Plants grown using aeroponics spend 99.98% of their time in air and 0.02% in direct contact with hydro-atomized nutrient solution. The time spent without water allows the roots to capture oxygen more efficiently.  Furthermore, the hydro-atomized mist also significantly contributes to the effective oxygenation of the roots.  For example, Nutrient Film Technique (NFT) has a nutrient throughput of 1 liter per minute compared to aeroponics' throughput of 1.5 milliliters per minute.

The reduced volume of nutrient throughput results in reduced amounts of nutrients required for plant development.

Another benefit of the reduced throughput, of major significance for space-based use, is the reduction in water volume used.  This reduction in water volume throughput corresponds with a reduced buffer volume, both of which significantly lighten the weight needed to maintain plant growth.  In addition, the volume of effluent from the plants is also reduced with aeroponics, reducing the amount of water that needs to be treated before reuse.

The relatively low solution volumes used in aeroponics, coupled with the minimal amount of time that the roots are exposed to the hydro-atomized mist, minimizes root-to-root contact and spread of pathogens between plants.

Greater control of plant environment

Aeroponics allows more control of the environment around the root zone, as, unlike other plant growth systems such as hydroponics, the plant roots are not constantly surrounded by some medium.

Improved nutrient feeding
A variety of different nutrient solutions can be administered to the root zone using aeroponics without needing to flush out any solution or matrix in which the roots had previously been immersed. This elevated level of control would be useful when researching the effect of a varied regimen of nutrient application to the roots of a plant species of interest.
In a similar manner, aeroponics allows a greater range of growth conditions than other nutrient delivery systems. The interval and duration of the nutrient spray, for example, can be very finely attuned to the needs of a specific plant species.
The aerial tissue can be subjected to a completely different environment from that of the roots.

More user-friendly
The design of an aeroponic system allows ease of working with the plants. This results from the separation of the plants from each other, and the fact that the plants are suspended in air and the roots are not entrapped in any kind of matrix.  Consequently, the harvesting of individual plants is quite simple and straightforward.  Likewise, removal of any plant that may be infected with some type of pathogen is easily accomplished without risk of uprooting or contaminating nearby plants.

More cost effective

Aeroponic systems are more cost effective than other systems.  Because of the reduced volume of solution throughput (discussed above), less water and fewer nutrients are needed in the system at any given time compared to other nutrient delivery systems.  The need for substrates is also eliminated, as is the need for many moving parts .

Use of seed stocks
With aeroponics, the deleterious effects of seed stocks that are infected with pathogens can be minimized.  As discussed above, this is due to the separation of the plants and the lack of shared growth matrix.  In addition, due to the enclosed, controlled environment, aeroponics can be an ideal growth system in which to grow seed stocks that are pathogen-free.  The enclosing of the growth chamber, in addition to the isolation of the plants from each other discussed above, helps to both prevent initial contamination from pathogens introduced from the external environment and minimize the spread from one plant to others of any pathogens that may exist.

21st century aeroponics

Aeroponics is an improvement in artificial life support for non-damaging plant support, seed germination, environmental control and rapid unrestricted growth when compared with hydroponics and drip irrigation techniques that have been used for decades by traditional agriculturalists.

Contemporary aeroponics
Contemporary aeroponic techniques have been researched at NASA's research and commercialization center
BioServe Space Technologies located on the campus of the University of Colorado in Boulder, Colorado. Other research includes enclosed loop system research at Ames Research Center, where scientists were studying methods of growing food crops in low gravity situations for future space colonization.

In 2000, Stoner was granted a patent for an organic disease control biocontrol technology that allows for pesticide-free natural growing in an aeroponic systems.

In 2004, Ed Harwood, founder of AeroFarms, invented an aeroponic system that grows lettuces on micro fleece cloth. AeroFarms, utilizing Harwood's patented aeroponic technology, is now operating the largest indoor vertical farm in the world based on annual growing capacity in Newark, New Jersey. By using aeroponic technology the farm is able to produce and sell up to two million pounds of pesticide-free leafy greens per year.

Aeroponic bio-pharming

Aeroponic bio-pharming is used to grow pharmaceutical medicine inside of plants. The technology allows for completed containment of allow effluents and by-products of biopharma crops to remain inside a closed-loop facility.
As recently as 2005, GMO research at South Dakota State University by Dr. Neil Reese applied aeroponics to grow genetically modified corn.

According to Reese it is a historical feat to grow corn in an aeroponic apparatus for bio-massing. The university's past attempts to grow all types of corn using hydroponics ended in failure.

Using advanced aeroponics techniques to grow genetically modified corn Reese harvested full ears of corn, while containing the corn pollen and spent effluent water and preventing them from entering the environment.  Containment of these by-products ensures the environment remains safe from GMO contamination.

Reese says, aeroponics offers the ability to make bio-pharming economically practical.

Large scale integration of aeroponics
In 2006, the Institute of Biotechnology at Vietnam National University of Agriculture, in joint efforts with Stoner, established a postgraduate doctoral program in aeroponics. The university's Agrobiotech Research Center, under the direction of Professor Nguyen Quang Thach, is using aeroponic laboratories to advance Vietnam's minituber potato production for certified seed potato production.

The historical significance for aeroponics is that it is the first time a nation has specifically called out for aeroponics to further an agricultural sector, stimulate farm economic goals, meet increased demands, improve food quality and increase production.

"We have shown that aeroponics, more than any other form of agricultural technology, will significantly improve Vietnam's potato production. We have very little tillable land, aeroponics makes complete economic sense to us", attested Thach.

Vietnam joined the World Trade Organization (WTO) in January 2007.

Aeroponic integration in Vietnamese agriculture begins by producing a low cost certified disease-free organic minitubers, which in turn supplies local farmers for their field plantings of seed potatoes and commercial potatoes. Potato farmers will benefit from aeroponics because their seed potatoes will be disease-free and grown without pesticides. Most importantly for the Vietnamese farmer, it will lower their cost of operation and increase their yields, says Thach.

See also
 Aerial root
 Plant nutrition

References

External links

NASA Web Site: Aeroponic Plants
NASA Web Site: Aeroponic High Performance Food Production
NASA Web Site: Low Mass Aeroponics
"Re-examining Aeroponics for Spaceflight Plant Growth"
Astronaut Don Pettit Grows Zucchini on ISS Expedition 31
AeroFarms (paywall)
 Aerogarden - home aeroponic plant growing system.
 Aeroponics 101 - History of Aeroponics and components of aeroponic system

 
Agricultural soil science
Horticultural techniques
Hydroculture
NASA spin-off technologies